Ole Benediktson (born 19 February 1949) is a Danish gymnast. He competed at the 1972 Summer Olympics and the 1976 Summer Olympics.

References

External links
 

1949 births
Living people
Danish male artistic gymnasts
Olympic gymnasts of Denmark
Gymnasts at the 1972 Summer Olympics
Gymnasts at the 1976 Summer Olympics
People from Silkeborg
Sportspeople from the Central Denmark Region